Feyling is a surname. Notable people with the surname include:

Claus Egil Feyling (1916–1989), Norwegian politician
Sigmund Feyling (1895–1980), Norwegian priest 
Thorbjørn Feyling (1907–1985), Norwegian ceramist 

Norwegian-language surnames